The   A 4  is a Portuguese motorway with a length of , running from Matosinhos to Amarante, where it narrows to become an IP road, signed as   IP4 .

The motorway leaves the metropolitan area of Porto, through the urban areas of Ermesinde, Valongo, Paredes, Penafiel, until arriving at the mountainous town of Amarante. It is also known as one of the most dangerous motorways in the country, particularly the descent from Campo to Valongo. Many improvements are being projected by the government in this respect.

Tolls are levied.

In 2013 the highway was extended from Serra do Marão to Bragança and the Portugal–Spain border, where it connects to the N-122 road (Spain).

Marão tunnel
On 7 May 2016, the Marão Tunnel was opened to traffic.

References

Motorways in Portugal